The Dwight D. Eisenhower National System of Interstate and Defense Highways, commonly known as the Interstate Highway System, is a network of controlled-access highways that forms part of the National Highway System in the United States. The system extends throughout the contiguous United States and has routes in Hawaii, Alaska, and Puerto Rico.

The United States Congress first funded roadways through the Federal Aid Road Act of 1916, and began an effort to construct a national road grid with the passage of the Federal Aid Highway Act of 1921. In 1926, the United States Numbered Highway System was established, creating the first national road numbering system for cross-country travel. The roads were state-funded and maintained, and there were few national standards for road design. United States Numbered Highways ranged from two-lane country roads to multi-lane freeways. After Dwight D. Eisenhower became president in 1953, his administration developed a proposal for an interstate highway system, eventually resulting in the enactment of the Federal Aid Highway Act of 1956.

Unlike the earlier United States Numbered Highway System, the Interstates were designed to be an all-freeway system, with nationally unified standards for construction and signage. While some older freeways were adopted into the system, most of the routes were completely new construction, greatly expanding the freeway network in the United States. Particularly in densely populated urban areas, these new freeways were often controversial as their building necessitated the destruction of many older, well-established neighborhoods; as a result of the many freeway revolts during the 1960s and 1970s, several planned Interstates were abandoned or re-routed to avoid urban cores.

Construction of the original Interstate Highway System was proclaimed complete in 1992, despite deviations from the original 1956 plan and several stretches that did not fully conform with federal standards. The construction of the Interstate Highway System cost approximately $114 billion (equivalent to $ in ). The system has continued to expand and grow as additional federal funding has provided for new routes to be added, and many future Interstate Highways are currently either being planned or under construction.

Though much of their construction was funded by the federal government, Interstate Highways are owned by the state in which they were built. With few exceptions, all Interstates must meet specific standards, such as having controlled access, physical barriers or median strips between lanes of oncoming traffic, breakdown lanes, avoiding at-grade intersections, no traffic lights and complying with federal traffic sign specifications. Interstate Highways use a numbering scheme in which primary Interstates are assigned one- or two-digit numbers, and shorter routes which branch off of longer ones are assigned three-digit numbers where the last two digits match the parent route. The Interstate Highway System is partially financed through the Highway Trust Fund, which itself is funded by a federal fuel tax. Though federal legislation initially banned the collection of tolls, some Interstate routes are toll roads, either because they were grandfathered into the system or because subsequent legislation has allowed for tolling of Interstates in some cases.

History

Planning

The United States government's efforts to construct a national network of highways began on an ad hoc basis with the passage of the Federal Aid Road Act of 1916, which provided $75 million over a five-year period for matching funds to the states for the construction and improvement of highways. The nation's revenue needs associated with World War I prevented any significant implementation of this policy, which expired in 1921.

In December 1918, E. J. Mehren, a civil engineer and the editor of Engineering News-Record, presented his "A Suggested National Highway Policy and Plan" during a gathering of the State Highway Officials and Highway Industries Association at the Congress Hotel in Chicago. In the plan, Mehren proposed a  system, consisting of five east–west routes and 10 north–south routes.

In 1919, the U.S. Army sent an expedition across the U.S. to determine the difficulties that military vehicles would have on a cross-country trip. Leaving from the Ellipse near the White House on July 7, the Motor Transport Corps convoy needed 62 days to drive  on the Lincoln Highway to the Presidio army base on San Francisco Bay. The convoy suffered many setbacks and problems on the route, such as poor-quality bridges, broken crankshafts, and engines clogged with desert sand.

Dwight Eisenhower, then a 28-year-old brevet lieutenant colonel, accompanied the trip "through darkest America with truck and tank," as he later described it. Some roads in the West were a "succession of dust, ruts, pits, and holes."

As the landmark 1916 law expired, new legislation was passed—the Federal Aid Highway Act of 1921 (Phipps Act). This new road construction initiative once again provided for federal matching funds for road construction and improvement, $75 million allocated annually. Moreover, this new legislation for the first time sought to target these funds to the construction of a national road grid of interconnected "primary highways", setting up cooperation among the various state highway planning boards.

The Bureau of Public Roads asked the Army to provide a list of roads that it considered necessary for national defense.

A boom in road construction followed throughout the decade of the 1920s, with such projects as the New York parkway system constructed as part of a new national highway system. As automobile traffic increased, planners saw a need for such an interconnected national system to supplement the existing, largely non-freeway, United States Numbered Highways system. By the late 1930s, planning had expanded to a system of new superhighways.

In 1938, President Franklin D. Roosevelt gave Thomas MacDonald, chief at the Bureau of Public Roads, a hand-drawn map of the United States marked with eight superhighway corridors for study. In 1939, Bureau of Public Roads Division of Information chief Herbert S. Fairbank wrote a report called Toll Roads and Free Roads, "the first formal description of what became the Interstate Highway System" and, in 1944, the similarly themed Interregional Highways.

Federal Aid Highway Act of 1956

The Interstate Highway System gained a champion in President Dwight D. Eisenhower, who was influenced by his experiences as a young Army officer crossing the country in the 1919 Motor Transport Corps convoy that drove in part on the Lincoln Highway, the first road across America. He recalled that, "The old convoy had started me thinking about good two-lane highways... the wisdom of broader ribbons across our land." Eisenhower also gained an appreciation of the Reichsautobahn system, the first "national" implementation of modern Germany's Autobahn network, as a necessary component of a national defense system while he was serving as Supreme Commander of Allied Forces in Europe during World War II. In 1954, Eisenhower appointed General Lucius D. Clay to head a committee charged with proposing an interstate highway system plan. Summing up motivations for the construction of such a system, Clay stated,

Clay's committee proposed a 10-year, $100 billion program, which would build  of divided highways linking all American cities with a population of greater than 50,000. Eisenhower initially preferred a system consisting of toll roads, but Clay convinced Eisenhower that toll roads were not feasible outside of the highly populated coastal regions. In February 1955, Eisenhower forwarded Clay's proposal to Congress. The bill quickly won approval in the Senate, but House Democrats objected to the use of public bonds as the means to finance construction. Eisenhower and the House Democrats agreed to instead finance the system through the Highway Trust Fund, which itself would be funded by a gasoline tax. In June 1956, Eisenhower signed the Federal Aid Highway Act of 1956 into law. Under the act, the federal government would pay for 90 percent of the cost of construction of Interstate Highways. Each Interstate Highway was required to be a freeway with at least four lanes and no at-grade crossings.

The publication in 1955 of the General Location of National System of Interstate Highways, informally known as the Yellow Book, mapped out what became the Interstate Highway System. Assisting in the planning was Charles Erwin Wilson, who was still head of General Motors when President Eisenhower selected him as Secretary of Defense in January 1953.

Construction

Some sections of highways that became part of the Interstate Highway System actually began construction earlier.

Three states have claimed the title of first Interstate Highway. Missouri claims that the first three contracts under the new program were signed in Missouri on August 2, 1956. The first contract signed was for upgrading a section of US Route 66 to what is now designated Interstate 44. On August 13, 1956, work began on US 40 (now I-70) in St. Charles County.

Kansas claims that it was the first to start paving after the act was signed. Preliminary construction had taken place before the act was signed, and paving started September 26, 1956. The state marked its portion of I-70 as the first project in the United States completed under the provisions of the new Federal-Aid Highway Act of 1956.

The Pennsylvania Turnpike could also be considered one of the first Interstate Highways, and is nicknamed "Grandfather of the Interstate System". On October 1, 1940,  of the highway now designated I‑70 and I‑76 opened between Irwin and Carlisle. The Commonwealth of Pennsylvania refers to the turnpike as the Granddaddy of the Pikes (referring to turnpikes).

Milestones in the construction of the Interstate Highway System include:
 October 17, 1974: Nebraska becomes the first state to complete all of its mainline Interstate Highways with the dedication of its final piece of I-80.
 October 12, 1979: The final section of the Canada to Mexico freeway Interstate 5 is dedicated near Stockton, California. Representatives of the two neighboring nations attended the dedication to commemorate the first contiguous freeway connecting the North American countries.
 August 22, 1986: The final section of the coast-to-coast I-80 (San Francisco, California, to Teaneck, New Jersey) is dedicated on the western edge of Salt Lake City, Utah, making I-80 the world's first contiguous freeway to span from the Atlantic to Pacific Ocean and, at the time, the longest contiguous freeway in the world. The section spanned from Redwood Road to just west of the Salt Lake City International Airport. At the dedication it was noted that coincidentally this was only  from Promontory Summit, where a similar feat was accomplished nearly 120 years prior, the driving of the golden spike of the United States' First transcontinental railroad.
 August 10, 1990: The final section of coast-to-coast I-10 (Santa Monica, California, to Jacksonville, Florida) is dedicated, the Papago Freeway Tunnel under downtown Phoenix, Arizona. Completion of this section was delayed due to a freeway revolt that forced the cancellation of an originally planned elevated routing.
 September 12, 1991: I-90 becomes the final coast-to-coast Interstate Highway (Seattle, Washington to Boston, Massachusetts) to be completed with the dedication of an elevated viaduct bypassing Wallace, Idaho. This section was delayed after residents forced the cancellation of the originally planned at-grade alignment that would have demolished much of downtown Wallace. The residents accomplished this feat by arranging for most of the downtown area to be declared a historic district and listed on the National Register of Historic Places; this succeeded in blocking the path of the original alignment. After the dedication residents held a mock funeral celebrating the removal of the last stoplight on a transcontinental Interstate Highway.
 October 14, 1992: The original Interstate Highway System is proclaimed to be complete with the opening of I-70 through Glenwood Canyon in Colorado. This section is considered an engineering marvel with a  span featuring 40 bridges and numerous tunnels and is one of the most expensive rural highways per mile built in the United States.

The initial cost estimate for the system was $25 billion over 12 years; it ended up costing $114 billion (equivalent to $425 billion in 2006 or $ in ) and took 35 years.

1992–present

Discontinuities

The system was proclaimed complete in 1992, but two of the original Interstates—I-95 and I-70—were not continuous: both of these discontinuities were due to local opposition, which blocked efforts to build the necessary connections to fully complete the system. I-95 was made a continuous freeway in 2018, and thus I-70 remains the only original Interstate with a discontinuity.

I-95 was discontinuous in New Jersey because of the cancellation of the Somerset Freeway. This situation was remedied when the construction of the Pennsylvania Turnpike/Interstate 95 Interchange Project started in 2010 and partially opened on September 22, 2018, which was already enough to fill the gap.

However, I-70 remains discontinuous in Pennsylvania, because of the lack of a direct interchange with the Pennsylvania Turnpike at the eastern end of the concurrency near Breezewood. Traveling in either direction, I-70 traffic must exit the freeway and use a short stretch of US-30 (which includes a number of roadside services) to rejoin I-70. The interchange was not originally built because of a legacy federal funding rule, since relaxed, which restricted the use of federal funds to improve roads financed with tolls. Solutions have been proposed to eliminate the discontinuity, but they have been blocked by local opposition, fearing a loss of business.

Expansion

The Interstate Highway System has been expanded numerous times. The expansions have both created new designations and extended existing designations. For example, I-49, added to the system in the 1980s as a freeway in Louisiana, was designated as an expansion corridor, and FHWA approved the expanded route north from Lafayette, Louisiana, to Kansas City, Missouri. The freeway exists today as separate completed segments, with segments under construction or in the planning phase between them.

In 1966, the FHWA designated the entire Interstate Highway System as part of the larger Pan-American Highway System, and at least two proposed Interstate expansions were initiated to help trade with Canada and Mexico spurred by the North American Free Trade Agreement (NAFTA). Long-term plans for I-69, which currently exists in several separate completed segments (the largest of which are in Indiana and Texas), is to have the highway route extend from Tamaulipas, Mexico to Ontario, Canada. The planned I-11 will then bridge the Interstate gap between Phoenix, Arizona and Las Vegas, Nevada, and thus form part of the CANAMEX Corridor (along with I-19, and portions of I-10 and I-15) between Sonora, Mexico and Alberta, Canada.

Urban Interstates abandoned because of local opposition

Political opposition from residents canceled many freeway projects around the United States, including:
 I-40 in Memphis, Tennessee was rerouted and part of the original I-40 is still in use as the eastern half of Sam Cooper Boulevard.
 I-66 in the District of Columbia was abandoned in 1977.
 I-69 was to continue past its terminus at Interstate 465 to intersect with Interstate 70 and Interstate 65 at the north split, northeast of downtown Indianapolis. Though local opposition led to the cancellation of this project in 1981, bridges and ramps for the connection into the "north split" remain visible.
 I-70 in Baltimore was supposed to run from the Baltimore Beltway (Interstate 695), which surrounds the city to terminate at I-95, the East Coast thoroughfare that runs through Maryland and Baltimore on a diagonal course, northeast to southwest; the connection was cancelled on the mid-1970s due to its routing through Gwynns Falls-Leakin Park, a wilderness urban park reserve following the Gwynns Falls stream through West Baltimore. This included the cancellation of I-170, partially built and in use as U.S. Route 40, and nicknamed the Highway to Nowhere.
 I-78 in New York City was canceled along with portions of I-278, I-478, and I-878 (now designated as New York State Route 878). I-878 was supposed to be part of I-78, and I-478 and I-278 were to be spur routes.
 I-80 in San Francisco was originally planned to travel past the city's Civic Center along the Panhandle Freeway into Golden Gate Park and terminate at the original alignment of I-280/SR 1. The city canceled this and several other freeways in 1958. Similarly, more than 20 years later, Sacramento canceled plans to upgrade I-80 to Interstate Standards and rerouted the freeway on what was then I-880 that traveled north of Downtown Sacramento.
 I-83, southern extension of the Jones Falls Expressway (southern I-83) in Baltimore was supposed to run along the waterfront of the Patapsco River / Baltimore Harbor to connect to I-95, bisecting historic neighborhoods of Fells Point and Canton, but the connection was never built.
 I-84 in Connecticut was once planned to fork east of Hartford, into an I-86 to Sturbridge, Massachusetts, and I-84 to Providence, R.I. The plan was cancelled, primarily because of anticipated impact on a major Rhode Island reservoir. The I-84 designation was restored to the highway to Sturbridge, and other numbering was used for completed Eastern sections of what had been planned as part of I-84.
 I-95 through the District of Columbia into Maryland was abandoned in 1977. Instead it was rerouted to I-495 (Capital Beltway). The completed section is now I-395.
 I-95 was originally planned to run up the Southwest Expressway and meet I-93, where the two highways would travel along the Central Artery through downtown Boston, but was rerouted onto the Route 128 beltway due to widespread opposition. This revolt also included the cancellation of the Inner Belt, connecting I-93 to I-90 and a cancelled section of the Northwest Expressway which would have carried US 3 inside the Route 128 beltway, meeting with Route 2 in Cambridge.

Standards

The American Association of State Highway and Transportation Officials (AASHTO) has defined a set of standards that all new Interstates must meet unless a waiver from the Federal Highway Administration (FHWA) is obtained. One almost absolute standard is the controlled access nature of the roads. With few exceptions, traffic lights (and cross traffic in general) are limited to toll booths and ramp meters (metered flow control for lane merging during rush hour).

Speed limits

Being freeways, Interstate Highways usually have the highest speed limits in a given area. Speed limits are determined by individual states.

Typically, lower limits are established in Northeastern and coastal states, while higher speed limits are established in inland states west of the Mississippi River. Other Interstates in Idaho, Montana, Oklahoma, South Dakota and Wyoming also have the same high speed limits.

In some areas, speed limits on Interstates can be significantly lower in areas where they traverse significantly hazardous areas. In some locations, low speed limits are the result of lawsuits and resident demands; after holding up the completion of I-35E in St. Paul, Minnesota, for nearly 30 years in the courts, residents along the stretch of the freeway from the southern city limit to downtown successfully lobbied for a  speed limit in addition to a prohibition on any vehicle weighing more than  gross vehicle weight. I-93 in Franconia Notch State Park in northern New Hampshire has a speed limit of  because it is a parkway that consists of only one lane per side of the highway.

Other uses
As one of the components of the National Highway System, Interstate Highways improve the mobility of military troops to and from airports, seaports, rail terminals, and other military bases. Interstate Highways also connect to other roads that are a part of the Strategic Highway Network, a system of roads identified as critical to the U.S. Department of Defense.

The system has also been used to facilitate evacuations in the face of hurricanes and other natural disasters. An option for maximizing traffic throughput on a highway is to reverse the flow of traffic on one side of a divider so that all lanes become outbound lanes. This procedure, known as contraflow lane reversal, has been employed several times for hurricane evacuations. After public outcry regarding the inefficiency of evacuating from southern Louisiana prior to Hurricane Georges' landfall in September 1998, government officials looked towards contraflow to improve evacuation times. In Savannah, Georgia, and Charleston, South Carolina, in 1999, lanes of I-16 and I-26 were used in a contraflow configuration in anticipation of Hurricane Floyd with mixed results.

In 2004 contraflow was employed ahead of Hurricane Charley in the Tampa, Florida area and on the Gulf Coast before the landfall of Hurricane Ivan; however, evacuation times there were no better than previous evacuation operations. Engineers began to apply lessons learned from the analysis of prior contraflow operations, including limiting exits, removing troopers (to keep traffic flowing instead of having drivers stop for directions), and improving the dissemination of public information. As a result, the 2005 evacuation of New Orleans, Louisiana, prior to Hurricane Katrina ran much more smoothly.

According to urban legend, early regulations required that one out of every five miles of the Interstate Highway System must be built straight and flat, so as to be usable by aircraft during times of war. There is no evidence of this rule being included in any Interstate legislation.

Numbering system

Primary (one- and two-digit) Interstates

The numbering scheme for the Interstate Highway System was developed in 1957 by the American Association of State Highway and Transportation Officials (AASHTO). The association's present numbering policy dates back to August 10, 1973. Within the contiguous United States, primary Interstates—also called main line Interstates or two-digit Interstates—are assigned numbers less than 100.

While numerous exceptions do exist, there is a general scheme for numbering Interstates. Primary Interstates are assigned one- or two-digit numbers, while shorter routes (such as spurs, loops, and short connecting roads) are assigned three-digit numbers where the last two digits match the parent route (thus, I-294 is a loop that connects at both ends to I-94, while I-787 is a short spur route attached to I-87). In the numbering scheme for the primary routes, east–west highways are assigned even numbers and north–south highways are assigned odd numbers. Odd route numbers increase from west to east, and even-numbered routes increase from south to north (to avoid confusion with the U.S. Highways, which increase from east to west and north to south). This numbering system usually holds true even if the local direction of the route does not match the compass directions. Numbers divisible by five are intended to be major arteries among the primary routes, carrying traffic long distances. Primary north–south Interstates increase in number from I-5 between Canada and Mexico along the West Coast to I‑95 between Canada and Miami, Florida along the East Coast. Major west–east arterial Interstates increase in number from I-10 between Santa Monica, California, and Jacksonville, Florida, to I-90 between Seattle, Washington, and Boston, Massachusetts, with two exceptions. There are no I-50 and I-60, as routes with those numbers would likely pass through states that currently have U.S. Highways with the same numbers, which is generally disallowed under highway administration guidelines.

Several two-digit numbers are shared between unconnected road segments at opposite ends of the country for various reasons. Some such highways are incomplete Interstates (such as I-69 and I-74) and some just happen to share route designations (such as I-76, I-84, I‑86, I-87, and I-88). Some of these were due to a change in the numbering system as a result of a new policy adopted in 1973. Previously, letter-suffixed numbers were used for long spurs off primary routes; for example, western I‑84 was I‑80N, as it went north from I‑80. The new policy stated, "No new divided numbers (such as I-35W and I-35E, etc.) shall be adopted." The new policy also recommended that existing divided numbers be eliminated as quickly as possible; however, an I-35W and I-35E still exist in the Dallas–Fort Worth metroplex in Texas, and an I-35W and I-35E that run through Minneapolis and Saint Paul, Minnesota, still exist. Additionally, due to Congressional requirements, three sections of I-69 in southern Texas will be divided into I-69W, I-69E, and I-69C (for Central).

AASHTO policy allows dual numbering to provide continuity between major control points. This is referred to as a concurrency or overlap. For example, I‑75 and I‑85 share the same roadway in Atlanta; this  section, called the Downtown Connector, is labeled both I‑75 and I‑85. Concurrencies between Interstate and U.S. Route numbers are also allowed in accordance with AASHTO policy, as long as the length of the concurrency is reasonable. In rare instances, two highway designations sharing the same roadway are signed as traveling in opposite directions; one such wrong-way concurrency is found between Wytheville and Fort Chiswell, Virginia, where I‑81 north and I‑77 south are equivalent (with that section of road traveling almost due east), as are I‑81 south and I‑77 north.

Auxiliary (three-digit) Interstates

Auxiliary Interstate Highways are circumferential, radial, or spur highways that principally serve urban areas. These types of Interstate Highways are given three-digit route numbers, which consist of a single digit prefixed to the two-digit number of its parent Interstate Highway. Spur routes deviate from their parent and do not return; these are given an odd first digit. Circumferential and radial loop routes return to the parent, and are given an even first digit. Unlike primary Interstates, three-digit Interstates are signed as either east–west or north–south, depending on the general orientation of the route, without regard to the route number. For instance, I-190 in Massachusetts is labeled north–south, while I-195 in New Jersey is labeled east–west. Some looped Interstate routes use inner–outer directions instead of compass directions, when the use of compass directions would create ambiguity. Due to the large number of these routes, auxiliary route numbers may be repeated in different states along the mainline. Some auxiliary highways do not follow these guidelines, however.

Alaska, Hawaii, and Puerto Rico

The Interstate Highway System also extends to Alaska, Hawaii, and Puerto Rico, even though they have no direct land connections to any other states or territories. However, their residents still pay federal fuel and tire taxes.

The Interstates in Hawaii, all located on the most populous island of Oahu, carry the prefix H. There are three one-digit routes in the state (H-1, H-2, and H-3) and one auxiliary route (H-201). These Interstates connect several military and naval bases together, as well as the important communities spread across Oahu, and especially within the urban core of Honolulu.

Both Alaska and Puerto Rico also have public highways that receive 90 percent of their funding from the Interstate Highway program. The Interstates of Alaska and Puerto Rico are numbered sequentially in order of funding without regard to the rules on odd and even numbers. They also carry the prefixes A and PR, respectively. However, these highways are signed according to their local designations, not their Interstate Highway numbers. Furthermore, these routes were neither planned according to nor constructed to the official Interstate Highway standards.

Mile markers and exit numbers
On one- or two-digit Interstates, the mile marker numbering almost always begins at the southern or western state line. If an Interstate originates within a state, the numbering begins from the location where the road begins in the south or west.  As with all guidelines for Interstate routes, however, numerous exceptions exist.

Three-digit Interstates with an even first number that form a complete circumferential (circle) bypass around a city feature mile markers that are numbered in a clockwise direction, beginning just west of an Interstate that bisects the circumferential route near a south polar location. In other words, mile marker 1 on I-465, a  route around Indianapolis, is just west of its junction with I-65 on the south side of Indianapolis (on the south leg of I-465), and mile marker 53 is just east of this same junction. An exception is I-495 in the Washington metropolitan area, with mileposts increasing counterclockwise because part of that road is also part of I-95.

Most Interstate Highways use distance-based exit numbers so that the exit number is the same as the nearest mile marker.  If multiple exits occur within the same mile, letter suffixes may be appended to the numbers in alphabetical order starting with A.  A small number of Interstate Highways (mostly in the Northeastern United States) use sequential-based exit numbering schemes (where each exit is numbered in order starting with 1, without regard for the mile markers on the road).  One Interstate Highway, I-19 in Arizona, is signed with kilometer-based exit numbers. In the state of New York, most Interstate Highways use sequential exit numbering, with some exceptions.

Business routes

AASHTO defines a category of special routes separate from primary and auxiliary Interstate designations. These routes do not have to comply to Interstate construction or limited-access standards but are routes that may be identified and approved by the association. The same route marking policy applies to both US Numbered Highways and Interstate Highways; however, business route designations are sometimes used for Interstate Highways. Known as Business Loops and Business Spurs, these routes principally travel through the corporate limits of a city, passing through the central business district when the regular route is directed around the city. They also use a green shield instead of the red and blue shield. An example would be Business Loop Interstate 75 at Pontiac, Michigan, which follows surface roads into and through downtown. Sections of BL I-75's routing had been part of US 10 and M-24, predecessors of I-75 in the area.

Financing

Interstate Highways and their rights-of-way are owned by the state in which they were built. The last federally owned portion of the Interstate System was the Woodrow Wilson Bridge on the Washington Capital Beltway. The new bridge was completed in 2009 and is collectively owned by Virginia and Maryland. Maintenance is generally the responsibility of the state department of transportation. However, there are some segments of Interstate owned and maintained by local authorities.

About 70 percent of the construction and maintenance costs of Interstate Highways in the United States have been paid through user fees, primarily the fuel taxes collected by the federal, state, and local governments. To a much lesser extent they have been paid for by tolls collected on toll highways and bridges. The federal gasoline tax was first imposed in 1932 at one cent per gallon; during the Eisenhower administration, the Highway Trust Fund, established by the Highway Revenue Act in 1956, prescribed a three-cent-per-gallon fuel tax, soon increased to 4.5 cents per gallon. Since 1993 the tax has remained at 18.4 cents per gallon. Other excise taxes related to highway travel also accumulated in the Highway Trust Fund. Initially, that fund was sufficient for the federal portion of building the Interstate system, built in the early years with "10 cent dollars", from the perspective of the states, as the federal government paid 90% of the costs while the state paid 10%. The system grew more rapidly than the rate of the taxes on fuel and other aspects of driving (e. g., excise tax on tires).

The rest of the costs of these highways are borne by general fund receipts, bond issues, designated property taxes, and other taxes. The federal contribution comes overwhelmingly from motor vehicle and fuel taxes (93.5 percent in 2007), as does about 60 percent of the state contribution. However, any local government contributions are overwhelmingly from sources besides user fees. As decades passed in the 20th century and into the 21st century, the portion of the user fees spent on highways themselves covers about 57 percent of their costs, with about one-sixth of the user fees being sent to other programs, including the mass transit systems in large cities. Some large sections of Interstate Highways that were planned or constructed before 1956 are still operated as toll roads, for example the Massachusetts Turnpike (I-90), the New York State Thruway (I-87 and I-90), and Kansas Turnpike (I-35, I-335, I-470, I-70). Others have had their construction bonds paid off and they have become toll-free, such as the Connecticut Turnpike (I‑95), the Richmond-Petersburg Turnpike in Virginia (also I‑95), and the Kentucky Turnpike (I‑65).

As American suburbs have expanded, the costs incurred in maintaining freeway infrastructure have also grown, leaving little in the way of funds for new Interstate construction. This has led to the proliferation of toll roads (turnpikes) as the new method of building limited-access highways in suburban areas. Some Interstates are privately maintained (for example, the VMS company maintains I‑35 in Texas) to meet rising costs of maintenance and allow state departments of transportation to focus on serving the fastest-growing regions in their states.

Parts of the Interstate System might have to be tolled in the future to meet maintenance and expansion demands, as has been done with adding toll HOV/HOT lanes in cities such as Atlanta, Dallas, and Los Angeles. Although part of the tolling is an effect of the SAFETEA‑LU act, which has put an emphasis on toll roads as a means to reduce congestion, present federal law does not allow for a state to change a freeway section to a tolled section for all traffic.

Tolls

About  of toll roads are included in the Interstate Highway System. While federal legislation initially banned the collection of tolls on Interstates, many of the toll roads on the system were either completed or under construction when the Interstate Highway System was established. Since these highways provided logical connections to other parts of the system, they were designated as Interstate highways. Congress also decided that it was too costly to either build toll-free Interstates parallel to these toll roads, or directly repay all the bondholders who financed these facilities and remove the tolls. Thus, these toll roads were grandfathered into the Interstate Highway System.

Toll roads designated as Interstates (such as the Massachusetts Turnpike) were typically allowed to continue collecting tolls, but are generally ineligible to receive federal funds for maintenance and improvements. Some toll roads that did receive federal funds to finance emergency repairs (notably the Connecticut Turnpike (I-95) following the Mianus River Bridge collapse) were required to remove tolls as soon as the highway's construction bonds were paid off. In addition, these toll facilities were grandfathered from Interstate Highway standards. A notable example is the western approach to the Benjamin Franklin Bridge in Philadelphia, where I-676 has a surface street section through a historic area.

Policies on toll facilities and Interstate Highways have since changed. The Federal Highway Administration has allowed some states to collect tolls on existing Interstate Highways, while a recent extension of I-376 included a section of Pennsylvania Route 60 that was tolled by the Pennsylvania Turnpike Commission before receiving Interstate designation. Also, newer toll facilities (like the tolled section of I-376, which was built in the early 1990s) must conform to Interstate standards. A new addition of the Manual on Uniform Traffic Control Devices in 2009 requires a black-on-yellow "Toll" sign to be placed above the Interstate trailblazer on Interstate Highways that collect tolls.

Legislation passed in 2005 known as SAFETEA-LU, encouraged states to construct new Interstate Highways through "innovative financing" methods. SAFETEA-LU facilitated states to pursue innovative financing by easing the restrictions on building interstates as toll roads, either through state agencies or through public–private partnerships. However, SAFETEA-LU left in place a prohibition of installing tolls on existing toll-free Interstates, and states wishing to toll such routes to finance upgrades and repairs must first seek approval from Congress.  Many states have started using High-occupancy toll lane and other partial tolling methods, whereby certain lanes of highly congested freeways are tolled, while others are left free, allowing people to pay a fee to travel in less congested lanes.  Examples of recent projects to add HOT lanes to existing freeways include the Virginia HOT lanes on the Virginia portions of the Capital Beltway and other related interstate highways (I-95, I-495, I-395) and the addition of express toll lanes to Interstate 77 in North Carolina in the Charlotte metropolitan area.

Chargeable and non-chargeable Interstate routes
Interstate Highways financed with federal funds are known as "chargeable" Interstate routes, and are considered part of the  network of highways. Federal laws also allow "non-chargeable" Interstate routes, highways funded similarly to state and U.S. Highways to be signed as Interstates, if they both meet the Interstate Highway standards and are logical additions or connections to the system. These additions fall under two categories: routes that already meet Interstate standards, and routes not yet upgraded to Interstate standards. Only routes that meet Interstate standards may be signed as Interstates once their proposed number is approved.

Signage

Interstate shield

Interstate Highways are signed by a number placed on a red, white, and blue sign. The shield design itself is a registered trademark of the American Association of State Highway and Transportation Officials. The colors red, white, and blue were chosen because they are the colors of the American flag. In the original design, the name of the state was displayed above the highway number, but in many states, this area is now left blank, allowing for the printing of larger and more-legible digits. Signs with the shield alone are placed periodically throughout each Interstate as reassurance markers.

Interstate business loops and spurs use a special shield in which the red and blue are replaced with green, the word "BUSINESS" appears instead of "INTERSTATE", and the word "SPUR" or "LOOP" usually appears above the number. The green shield is employed to mark the main route through a city's central business district, which intersects the associated Interstate at one (spur) or both (loop) ends of the business route. The route usually traverses the main thoroughfare(s) of the city's downtown area or other major business district. A city may have more than one Interstate-derived business route, depending on the number of Interstates passing through a city and the number of significant business districts therein.

Over time, the design of the Interstate shield has changed. The Manual on Uniform Traffic Control Devices (MUTCD) standards revised the shield in the 1961, 1971, and 1978 editions.

Exit numbering

The majority of Interstates have exit numbers. Like other highways, Interstates feature guide signs that list control cities to help direct drivers through interchanges and exits toward their desired destination. All traffic signs and lane markings on the Interstates are supposed to be designed in compliance with the Manual on Uniform Traffic Control Devices (MUTCD). There are, however, many local and regional variations in signage.

For many years, California was the only state that did not use an exit numbering system. It was granted an exemption in the 1950s due to having an already largely completed and signed highway system; placing exit number signage across the state was deemed too expensive. To control costs, California began to incorporate exit numbers on its freeways in 2002—Interstate, U.S., and state routes alike. Caltrans commonly installs exit number signage only when a freeway or interchange is built, reconstructed, retrofitted, or repaired, and it is usually tacked onto the top-right corner of an already existing sign. Newer signs along the freeways follow this practice as well. Most exits along California's Interstates now have exit number signage, particularly in rural areas. California, however, still does not use mileposts, although a few exist for experiments or for special purposes. In 2010–2011, the Illinois State Toll Highway Authority posted all new mile markers to be uniform with the rest of the state on I‑90 (Jane Addams Memorial/Northwest Tollway) and the I‑94 section of the Tri‑State Tollway, which previously had matched the I‑294 section starting in the south at I‑80/I‑94/IL Route 394. This also applied to the tolled portion of the Ronald Reagan Tollway (I-88). The tollway also added exit number tabs to the exits.

Exit numbers correspond to Interstate mileage markers in most states. On I‑19 in Arizona, however, length is measured in kilometers instead of miles because, at the time of construction, a push for the United States to change to a metric system of measurement had gained enough traction that it was mistakenly assumed that all highway measurements would eventually be changed to metric;  proximity to metric-using Mexico may also have been a factor, as I‑19 indirectly connects I‑10 to the Mexican Federal Highway system via surface streets in Nogales. Mileage count increases from west to east on most even-numbered Interstates; on odd-numbered Interstates mileage count increases from south to north.

Some highways, including the New York State Thruway, use sequential exit-numbering schemes. Exits on the New York State Thruway count up from Yonkers traveling north, and then west from Albany. I‑87 in New York State is numbered in three sections. The first section makes up the Major Deegan Expressway in the Bronx, with interchanges numbered sequentially from 1 to 14. The second section of I‑87 is a part of the New York State Thruway that starts in Yonkers (exit 1) and continues north to Albany (exit 24); at Albany, the Thruway turns west and becomes I‑90 for exits 25 to 61. From Albany north to the Canadian border, the exits on I‑87 are numbered sequentially from 1 to 44 along the Adirondack Northway. This often leads to confusion as there is more than one exit on I‑87 with the same number. For example, exit 4 on Thruway section of I‑87 connects with the Cross County Parkway in Yonkers, but exit 4 on the Northway is the exit for the Albany airport.

Many northeastern states label exit numbers sequentially, regardless of how many miles have passed between exits. States in which Interstate exits are still numbered sequentially are Connecticut, Delaware, New Hampshire, New York, Rhode Island, and Vermont; as such, three of the main Interstate Highways that remain completely within these states (87, 88, 89) have interchanges numbered sequentially along their entire routes. Maine, Massachusetts, Pennsylvania, Virginia, Georgia, and Florida followed this system for a number of years, but have since converted to mileage-based exit numbers. Georgia renumbered in 2000, while Maine did so in 2004—Massachusetts was the most recent state to convert their exit numbers, finishing in 2021. The Pennsylvania Turnpike uses both mile marker numbers and sequential numbers. Mile marker numbers are used for signage, while sequential numbers are used for numbering interchanges internally. The New Jersey Turnpike, including the portions that are signed as I‑95 and I‑78, also has sequential numbering, but other Interstates within New Jersey use mile markers.

Sign locations
There are four common signage methods on Interstates:
 Locating a sign on the ground to the side of the highway, mostly the right, and is used to denote exits, as well as rest areas, motorist services such as gas and lodging, recreational sites, and freeway names
 Attaching the sign to an overpass
 Mounting on full gantries that bridge the entire width of the highway and often show two or more signs
 Mounting on half-gantries that are located on one side of the highway, like a ground-mounted sign

Statistics

Volume
 Heaviest traveled: 379,000 vehicles per day: I-405 in Los Angeles, California (2011 estimate).

Elevation
 Highest: : I-70 in the Eisenhower Tunnel at the Continental Divide in the Colorado Rocky Mountains.
 Lowest (land): : I-8 at the New River near Seeley, California.
 Lowest (underwater): : I-95 in the Fort McHenry Tunnel under the Baltimore Inner Harbor.

Length
 Longest (east–west): : I-90 from Boston, Massachusetts, to Seattle, Washington.
 Longest (north–south): : I-95 from the Canadian border near Houlton, Maine, to Miami, Florida. 
 Shortest (two-digit): : I-69W in Laredo, Texas.
 Shortest (auxiliary): : I-878 in Queens, New York, New York.
 Longest segment between state lines: : I-10 in Texas from the New Mexico state line near El Paso to the Louisiana state line near Orange, Texas.
 Shortest segment between state lines: : Interstate 95/I-495 (Capital Beltway) on the Woodrow Wilson Bridge across the Potomac River where they briefly cross the southernmost tip of the District of Columbia between its borders with Maryland and Virginia.
 Longest concurrency: : I-80 and I-90; Gary, Indiana, to Elyria, Ohio.

States
 Most states served by an Interstate: 15 states plus the District of Columbia: I-95 through Florida, Georgia, South Carolina, North Carolina, Virginia, DC, Maryland, Delaware, Pennsylvania, New Jersey, New York, Connecticut, Rhode Island, Massachusetts, New Hampshire, and Maine.
 Most Interstates in a state: 32 routes: New York, totaling 
 Most primary Interstates in a state: 13 routes: Illinois
 Most Interstate mileage in a state: : Texas, in 17 different routes.
 Fewest Interstates in a state: 3 routes: Delaware, New Mexico, North Dakota, Puerto Rico, and Rhode Island.
 Fewest primary Interstates in a state: 1 route: Delaware, Maine, and Rhode Island (I-95 in each case).
 Least Interstate mileage in a state: : Delaware, in 3 different routes.

Impact and reception

Following the passage of the Federal Aid Highway Act of 1956, the railroad system for passengers and freight declined sharply, but the trucking industry expanded dramatically and the cost of shipping and travel fell sharply. Suburbanization became possible, with the rapid growth of larger, sprawling, and more car dependent housing than was available in central cities. Tourism dramatically expanded as well, creating a demand for more service stations, motels, restaurants and visitor attractions. There was much more long-distance movement to the Sun Belt for winter vacations, or for permanent relocation, with convenient access to visits to relatives back home. In rural areas, towns and small cities off the grid lost out as shoppers followed the interstate and new factories were located near them. 

The system had a profound effect on interstate shipping. The Interstate Highway System was being constructed at the same time as the intermodal shipping container made its debut. These containers could be placed on trailers behind trucks and shipped across the country with ease. A new road network and shipping containers that could be easily moved from ship to train to truck, meant that overseas manufacturers and domestic startups could get their products to market quicker than ever, allowing for accelerated economic growth. Forty years after its construction, the Interstate Highway system returned on investment, making $6 for every $1 spent on the project.

The system had a particularly strong effect in Southern states, where major highways were inadequate. The new system facilitated the relocation of heavy manufacturing to the South and spurred the development of Southern-based corporations like Walmart (in Arkansas) and FedEx (in Tennessee).

The Interstate Highway System also dramatically affected American culture, causing cars to become central to the American identity, and essential for living. Before, driving was considered an excursion that required some amount of skill and could have some chance of unpredictability. With the standardization of signs, road widths and rules, these unpredictabilities became a thing of the past. Justin Fox wrote, "By making road more reliable and by making Americans more reliant on them, they took away most of the adventure and romance associated with driving."

The Interstate Highway System has been criticized for contributing to the decline of some cities that were too far from it and for displacing minority neighborhoods in urban centers. Highways have also been criticized for increasing racial segregation by creating physical barriers between neighborhoods. One example of this is the journal article, "What Did Interstate Highways Do to Urban Neighborhoods?”. This journal article brings up the notion that the authors believe that the construction of urban highways led to the destruction of racially diverse neighborhoods. However, they also acknowledge that other contributing factors led to this well.  Other critics have blamed the Interstate Highway System for the decline of public transportation in the United States since the 1950s.

See also

 Highway systems by country
 List of controlled-access highway systems
 Non-motorized access on freeways

Notes

References

Further reading

External links

 
 Dwight D. Eisenhower National System of Interstate and Defense Highways, Federal Highway Administration (FHWA)
 Route Log and Finder List, FHWA
 Turner-Fairbank Highway Research Center, FHWA
 Interstate Highway System, Dwight D. Eisenhower Presidential Library and Museum
 "Keep on Trucking?: Would you pay more in taxes to fix roads and rail?", NOW on PBS

 
1956 establishments in the United States
Presidency of Dwight D. Eisenhower
Transport systems
Types of roads